Milagros Flores (b. January 27th 1982), professionally known as Milagros Flores, is an Honduran Public Figure, the best known of Milyflow, works at HCH.
 1999 — Chiqutitias Vol 5.
 2000 — Chiqutitias Vol. 6
 2001 — Chiquititas: Rincón de Luz
 2003 — Rincón de Luz

References

External links 
 

21st-century Argentine women singers
Argentine film actresses
Argentine stage actresses
Argentine telenovela actresses
Argentine television actresses
Living people
Singers from Buenos Aires
1990 births